Ronald Lamont "Winky" Wright (born November 26, 1971) is an American former professional boxer who competed from 1990 to 2012. He is a two-time light middleweight world champion and was the last to hold the undisputed title at that weight until Jermell Charlo in 2022. In his later career he also challenged for a unified middleweight world title. He announced his retirement from boxing in 2012, following a loss to Peter Quillin.

In 2005, The Ring magazine ranked him as the world's second best active boxer, pound for pound. In 2017, it was announced that Wright had been elected as an International Boxing Hall of Fame member in the Modern Category, alongside Vitali Klitschko and Érik Morales, with the induction ceremony scheduled for June 2018.

Professional career

Early years 
After his second-round knockout of Carlos Santana on July 30, 1992, in St. Petersburg, Florida, the ring announcer called him "Winky" Wright, the name given to him by his grandmother when he was 6 months old and that had unofficially stuck with him since he was 18 months old. The nickname stuck with him for the rest of his career following his win over Santana.

Major promoters like Don King and Lou Duva declined to work with Wright early in his career. His first promoters were the France-based Acaries brothers, who struck a deal for Wright to fight Darryl Lattimore in Luxembourg on January 1, 1993. Wright knocked Lattimore down three times and the fight was stopped. He then went on a tear during his tour of Europe, winning eight straight in France, Germany, and Monte Carlo while only fighting in the United States once over the next year.

First title shot 
On August 21, 1994, Wright received his first title match against WBA light-middleweight champion Julio César Vásquez in Saint-Jean-de-Luz, France. Although he was 25–0 at the time, Wright had not fought in a match that had gone more than 8 rounds. His inexperience showed as he lost a unanimous decision in controversial fashion, with Vasquez knocking down Wright in the second, seventh and ninth rounds, and twice in the twelfth round. Wright officially slipped three times and unofficially another four times while also appearing to win all but one round on points.

On February 4, 1995, Wright defeated Tony Marshall by unanimous decision to win the vacant NABF light-middleweight title.

Ongoing world tour and winning the WBO title 
Wright continued fighting in Europe, only fighting in the United States once, until his unanimous decision victory against Andrew Council on March 5, 1996. His impressive win opened the door to fight WBO light-middleweight champion Bronco McKart, a fight Wright won by split decision. Wright successfully defend his title in England three times; twice in Manchester against local fighters Ensley Bingham and Steve Foster, and Adrian Dodson in London.

Wright then traveled to South Africa where he lost his world title in controversial circumstances to the undefeated Harry Simon. After a very close contest the fight was initially ruled a draw, then minutes later changed to a majority decision win for Simon due to an apparent scoring error.

Moving to America 
He stopped working with the Acaries brothers in 1999, stating that he was tired of all the travelling. He went on to knock out Derrick Graham in the third round in Miami, Florida. Wright then challenged IBF light-middleweight champion Fernando Vargas. Although some ringside fans and members of the media felt that Wright had won the fight, Vargas ended up winning a controversial majority decision. Harold Lederman (a ringside boxing broadcaster for HBO whose job is to unofficially score fights) scored the bout 115–113, for Wright.

Wright continued to defend the NABF and won the USBA light-middleweight title in another decision over Bronco McKart.

IBF champion 
Félix Trinidad's jump to the middleweight division left the IBF light-middleweight title vacant. Wright scored a unanimous decision over Robert Frazier on October 12, 2001 to win the vacant title. In his first defense on February 2, 2002, Wright stopped Jason Papillion in the fifth round. He took a third fight against Bronco McKart, which ended in controversy as the referee disqualified McKart for repeated low blows in the 8th round.

For Wright's next fight, Oscar De La Hoya offered to fight him. However, because of the lack of money The Golden Boy was willing to give Wright for the fight, the deal fell through and Oscar fought Luis Ramon Campas for the WBA/WBC titles. Wright went on to debut on National Television Las Vegas against Juan Carlos Candelo on March 1, 2003 in a title defense, winning a unanimous decision. He followed that up with another blowout victory over Angel Hernandez 8 months later.

Wright vs. Mosley I & II 
To the surprise of many, including Wright, Shane Mosley challenged Winky to a light-middleweight unification title fight on March 13, 2004. Mosley was a celebrated fighter coming off his second win against Oscar De La Hoya and was looking for a tune-up fight to prepare for a super fight with Félix Trinidad. Shane had stated that he wanted to fight the winner of the fight between Wright and Angel Hernandez. Wright, being the winner, earned a fight with Shane Mosley. Wright was a 4 to 1 underdog against Mosley. During the fight, Wright pressed his will early on and discouraged Mosley with his size, effective jabbing and defense. Winky won a lopsided unanimous decision, unifying his IBF title with Mosley's Lineal/The Ring/WBC/WBA titles, to become undisputed light middleweight champion.

The rematch took place on November 20, 2004. This fight was much closer because Winky deliberately gave away some of the rounds and even dropped his hands in one round, in order to show that Mosley couldn't hurt him. Two judges scored 115–113 for Wright and one judge scored the bout a draw. Wright was awarded the majority decision, which despite Wright blatantly giving away a few of the rounds, was still a decisive victory in his favour. Soon after, Wright would vacate his titles to move up to the middleweight division to challenge Félix Trinidad.

Wright vs. Trinidad 
On May 14, 2005, with Wright once again playing the underdog role, he easily defeated Félix Trinidad by unanimous decision. Wright credits this fight as his greatest achievement in his career as he earned the respect and fan base of many that Félix Trinidad had behind him. Trinidad was a fan favorite and a feared power puncher and many figured he would be able to knock Wright out. But Wright's signature style defence and piston-like jab was too much for the Puerto Rican hero as Trinidad was having trouble landing punches throughout the fight (Two judges scored the fight 119–108 and one judge scored it 120–107). As a result of his dominant victory over such a highly regarded opponent,  many placed Wright among the top pound-for-pound boxers in the world. His victory would send Trinidad into his second retirement for three years.

Trinidad-Wright was also a WBC middleweight eliminator, giving Wright a shot at undisputed middleweight champion Jermain Taylor for his titles.

Middleweight title shot
After winning a unanimous decision over Sam Soliman in December 2005, Wright faced off against undisputed middleweight champion Jermain Taylor on June 17, 2006, at the FedEx Forum in Memphis, Tennessee for the Lineal/The Ring/WBC/WBO titles. In a very close fight, the match was ruled a draw. Two judges scored the bout 115–113 for each fighter, while the final judge scored it 114–114. Both camps attempted at negotiating a rematch, but talks failed after neither side could agree on how to split the money—a problem attributed to Wright's insistence on parity and Taylor's reluctance to give 50 percent to a challenger.

Wright returned to defeat Ike Quartey at middleweight by a unanimous twelve-round decision at St. Pete Times Forum, Tampa, Florida in December 2006. Two judges scored the fight 117–110, and one had the bout 117–109, all for Wright.

Hopkins vs. Wright
Wright's next fight came against Bernard Hopkins at a catch weight of 170 pounds on July 21, 2007. The bout aired on HBO pay-per-view. In the early rounds of the fight, there was no love lost as Hopkins outpointed Wright until a clash of heads (ruled unintentional) by Hopkins left a deep gash over Wright's eyebrow leading to Wright becoming the aggressor in the fight. Now fighting with a sense of urgency, Wright gave Hopkins problems due to his tight defense guarding the cut and landing combinations from the outside. Hopkins seemed to stick through the pressure and land flush combinations targeting the bloody eye. Hopkins won via unanimous decision on the judges' score cards (116–112, 117–111, 117–111).

It was Winky's first loss in eight years. In the post-fight interview, Wright was asked why he took the fight. He responded by saying, "I wanted to show everybody that I'm the best fighter out there, regardless of weight. If I fight the best, then I'll be the best."

Later years 
Wright ended a 21-month layoff when he faced former welterweight title holder Paul "The Punisher" Williams in a middleweight bout at Mandalay Bay, Las Vegas in April 2009. Wright lost via decision. Two judges scored the bout 119–109 for Williams while the 3rd judge scored the bout 120–108 for Williams. Wright won only the 5th round on two judges cards, while the 3rd judge scored all the rounds for Paul Williams.

After several failed attempts to stay active after the one-sided sweep by Paul Williams, Wright decided to get surgery on his knee during his inactivity, in the summer of 2010. Wright's most recent attempts were to get fights with Middleweight Champion Sergio Martínez, who knocked out Williams, and also a 160 lb. fight with Kelly Pavlik. He, however, successfully landed a fight with contender Grady Brewer on December 11, 2009 in San Juan, Puerto Rico. Wright and Brewer were ready and set to do battle until weeks before the fight, the promoters shut the PPV matchup down due to poor ticket sales.

On November 16, 2010, it surfaced on the internet that Wright's grandmother, Mary Dorsey, had died on November 3. When asked to give his thoughts on what had happened, Winky credited his grandmother for everything he had accomplished during his boxing career, in which he primarily stated that he wouldn't have been world champion if it wasn't for her. After the new year of 2011, Wright came out and gave his side and strategies to the Super Fight between Shane Mosley and Manny Pacquiao. During the interview, he also stated that he'll be coming back to fight on April 9 on the undercard of Marques-Morales against Matthew Macklin. Although it was not a title fight, both fighters have hopes that with the win over each other, they would have a shot at the Middleweight Champion Sergio Martínez at 160 lbs. Once again, weeks before the PPV the fight had to be canceled due to an injury to Winky's right hand.

Shortly after the showdown between Bernard Hopkins and Chad Dawson was made, it was stated that Dawson would not be working with trainer Emanuel Steward and instead would work with his previous trainer John Scully. Wright, being a good friend of Dawson's, offered to help him on his upcoming fight while getting him into physical shape. He stated in a brief, short interview, "No, I'm not a trainer and I'm not training Dawson. The fighting part of my career isn't even over, why would I want to start training? I'm just there to give advice and pointers to Dawson. Help him prepare for Hopkins and his dirty tactics. Hopkins is a dirty fighter." In an October interview, he stated that he will once again be coming back stating, "The junior middleweight division is full of people that call themselves champions when they ain't fought nobody. I'm coming back to take what's rightfully mine." He also stated that he'd made a mistake with just coming back and taking on a fighter like Paul Williams. He confirmed that he's going to take a couple tune-up fights hoping to grab one by December. He also, in the interview, he expressed interest in fighting WBA Light Middleweight Champion Miguel Cotto, WBC Light Middleweight Champion Saul Alvarez and The Ring Middleweight Champion Sergio Martínez in the future.

After a 3-year hiatus from boxing, Wright was expected to face Peter Quillin on May 26, 2012, but the date was changed to June 2, 2012 in order to satisfy the California State Athletic Commission. Quillin defeated Wright via a ten-round unanimous decision. Wright announced his retirement shortly after the fight.

Professional boxing record

Filmography

Life outside the ring 

Wright has appeared in music videos for Busta Rhymes' "Touch It Remix", 50 Cent's "Outta Control Remix", Jamie Foxx's  "DJ Play a Love Song", and 2 Pistols's  "She Got It" . He also appeared briefly in the cult hit State Property 2 along with Dame Dash and Beanie Sigel.

Wright has previously entered into ventures and endorsements with brands such as Reebok, Vitamin Water, Rocawear, State Property and 2(x)ist men's underwear among many others. Through these partnerships, Wright has appeared in television commercials and ad campaigns around New York City and in Men's Fitness, Men's Health, VIBE and VIBE VixeN magazines.

He currently owns an independent record label, Pound 4 Pound Records, also based in St. Petersburg, Florida. The label consists of a talent roster which covers genres of music from rock & roll to hip hop.

Wright now has his own promotion company called Winky Promotions.

Wright married Sayquana Barney on August 1, 2009. Winky often participates in charity events, in which he also has his own charity event called Winky Wright Foundation which gives him the opportunity to give back to the community. He currently resides in his hometown St. Petersburg, Florida.

See also
List of world light-middleweight boxing champions

References

External links 

Ronald "Winky" Wright profile at Cyber Boxing Zone

1971 births
Living people
African-American boxers
Middleweight boxers
World Boxing Association champions
World Boxing Council champions
International Boxing Federation champions
World Boxing Organization champions
Southpaw boxers
American male boxers
World light-middleweight boxing champions
The Ring (magazine) champions
Boxers from Florida
Boxers from Washington, D.C.
Light-heavyweight boxers
International Boxing Hall of Fame inductees